Swiss Alp is an unincorporated community in southern Fayette County, Texas, United States.

Swiss Alp was settled about 1865 by German Lutheran settlers. In 1889-1890, the residents built a United Evangelical Lutheran Church. This church is the second oldest Lutheran congregation in Texas.

References

External links
 SWISS ALP, TX Handbook of Texas Online.

German-American culture in Texas
Unincorporated communities in Fayette County, Texas
Unincorporated communities in Texas